Hydrophylax gracilis, also known as Gravenhorst's frog, Gravenhorst's golden-backed frog, and Sri Lanka wood frog, is a species of frog in the family Ranidae. It is endemic to Sri Lanka.

Hydrophylax gracilis occurs in marshes, agricultural land, grassland, and bush forests at elevations below . Adult frogs are semi-arboreal and semi-aquatic, whereas the tadpoles live in stagnant waters. H. gracilis is a common species that can be threatened by loss of its wetland habitats through wetland reclamation, urbanization, and aquatic agrochemical pollution. However, it is present in many protected areas.

References

gracilis
Frogs of Sri Lanka
Endemic fauna of Sri Lanka
Taxa named by Johann Ludwig Christian Gravenhorst
Amphibians described in 1829